Scott Reynolds is a television writer. He has written for the Showtime series Dexter and the Bruckheimer television series E-Ring. He has also created/written the comic book UTF (Undead Task Force) with Tone Rodriguez for APE comics.

Career
Reynolds worked as a freelance writer on the second season of Dexter in 2007. In 2008 he was given a staff writer position for the third season. Reynolds was nominated for a Writers Guild of America Award for best dramatic series at the February 2009 ceremony for his work on the third season. He was promoted to story editor for the fourth season in 2009. He was nominated for the award a second time at the February 2010 ceremony for his work on the fourth season. He was promoted again to executive story editor for the fifth season in 2010.

He has worked on the Marvel and Netflix television series' Jessica Jones (as co-showrunner for the third season) and Iron Fist and Marvel's Inhumans as a writer and executive producer.

References

External links
 

Year of birth missing (living people)
Living people
American male screenwriters
American male television writers
American television writers
Hugo Award-winning writers